Alec Price (31 March 1913 – 3 May 1999) was an Australian cricketer. He played in two first-class matches for Queensland in 1945/46.

See also
 List of Queensland first-class cricketers

References

External links
 

1913 births
1999 deaths
Australian cricketers
Queensland cricketers
Cricketers from Brisbane